Jicky Schnee is a Scottish model and a film, television and stage actress. Schnee was named after the Guerlain perfume "Jicky". Her modeling career took off when she unknowingly patted Steven Meisel's dog in an elevator.

Filmography

Film

Television

References

External links
 
 
Upstate Diary
Collective Gallery

Scottish film actresses
Place of birth missing (living people)
Year of birth missing (living people)
Scottish female models
Living people
21st-century Scottish actresses